Neil Elvis "Nicky" Winmar (born 25 September 1965) is a former Australian rules footballer, best known for his career for  and the  in the Australian Football League (AFL), as well as  in the West Australian Football League.

Growing up in Pingelly in the Wheatbelt region of Western Australia, Winmar began his career with South Fremantle, playing 58 games at the club before being recruited prior to the 1987 season by St Kilda. In a twelve-season career with St Kilda, Winmar won the club's best and fairest award, the Trevor Barker Award, in 1989 and 1995 and was also twice named in the All-Australian team. He left St Kilda at the end of the 1998 season and was drafted by the Western Bulldogs, playing one further season in the AFL before retiring at the end of the 1999 season. Having represented Western Australia in eight interstate matches, Winmar was named in St Kilda's Team of the Century in 2003 and was inducted into the West Australian Football Hall of Fame in 2009. An Indigenous Australian, he was the first Aboriginal footballer to play 200 games in the AFL and was named in the Indigenous Team of the Century in 2005. He was involved in several incidents of racial vilification during his career and a photograph of Winmar responding to one such incident during the 1993 season has been described as one of the most memorable images in Australian sporting history.

Early life and WAFL career
Neil Elvis Winmar was born in Kellerberrin, Western Australia, to Neal and Meryle Winmar. He grew up in the neighbouring Wheatbelt town of Pingelly, and played for the Brookton/Pingelly Football Club in the Upper Great Southern Football League (UGSFL) from an early age. Winmar was subsequently recruited by South Fremantle in the Perth-based WAFL after the club's coach at the time, Mal Brown, saw Winmar playing for Brookton/Pingelly. He made his senior debut for South Fremantle in round nine of the 1983 season, aged 17, and played a total of 13 games in his debut season. In the beginning, he was used across the wings and half-forward flanks, but was later played as a rover, although he remained a regular goal-kicker. In total, Winmar played 58 games for South Fremantle from 1983 to 1986 and kicked 98 goals.

VFL/AFL career

St Kilda
Winmar transferred to the St Kilda Football Club in the Victorian Football League (VFL) for the 1987 season, making his debut for the club in Round 1 against  at Moorabbin Oval. Having played 20 games in his debut season and kicking 37 goals, Winmar finished second in the club's best and fairest count behind Tony Lockett (who went on to win the Brownlow) and also polled 10 votes in the Brownlow Medal. In 1988, he kicked 43 goals from 21 games to be the club's leading goalkicker and again finished runner-up in the best and fairest count, this time to Danny Frawley. After an outstanding season in 1989, Winmar won St Kilda's best and fairest award and was also named in the VFL's Team of the Year on a half-forward flank. He also finished equal third in the 1989 Brownlow Medal, polling 16 votes from his 22 games.

After a match against  in Round 19 of the 1990 season, Winmar was suspended for 10 matches for kicking and eye-gouging Dermott Brereton. Brereton later apologised to Winmar for racially abusing him during the game. He returned to football in round seven of the 1991 season, recording 33 disposals and one goal against Adelaide at Moorabbin. Winmar's performances throughout the rest of the season led to him being named in the inaugural AFL All-Australian team. At the conclusion of the season, Winmar was named the winner of the Mark of the Year competition, for a spectacular mark taken at Subiaco Oval against . In round four of the 1993 season, indigenous players Winmar and Gilbert McAdam were racially abused by Collingwood supporters, eventually being awarded two and three Brownlow Medal votes in a game St Kilda won by 22 points. The week after the game, Winmar was involved in a dispute with St Kilda over his level of pay, in particular, injury payments, and did not play for the next two weeks.

Playing a total of 17 games in 1994, Winmar missed three weeks late in the season after being suspended for striking. At the end of the season, Winmar was also refused clearance by St Kilda to play in the Aboriginal All-Stars game, held at Marrara Oval in Darwin. In 1995, Winmar played in each of St Kilda's 22 games, winning the club's best and fairest award for a second time and also being named in the All-Australian team. In the pre-season competition held prior to the start of the 1996 season, the 1996 Ansett Australia Cup, Winmar played in St Kilda's team which defeated Carlton by 58 points in the grand final held at Waverley Park and was awarded the Michael Tuck Medal as best on ground. Having damaged the medial collateral ligament of his knee in the round three game against , Winmar missed nine matches in the early part of the 1996 season before returning in the latter part of the season. He also played in St Kilda's loss to Adelaide in the 1997 Grand Final, having kicked three goals against  in the preliminary final the previous week.

In 1998, in what was to be his last season for St Kilda, Winmar played 23 games and kicked 16 goals. He was heavily criticised during the club's match against Carlton in Round 20 after spending much of the game fighting with opponents, finishing with only eight disposals. Winmar was suspended by the club for the following match but returned to play for the club in the finals series. After the match, Winmar's manager, Peter Jess, was criticised for making comments in an interview with radio station 3AW suggesting that Aboriginal players were unable to cope with the pressures introduced by "white society".

Western Bulldogs
Winmar was dismissed from St Kilda at the end of the 1998 season after Tim Watson replaced Stan Alves as coach of the club. Despite being contracted for another year, the club terminated Winmar's contract as a result of his behaviour and lack of discipline over the previous season. He was then selected by the Western Bulldogs with the 30th pick overall in the 1998 National Draft, having been considered a chance to be drafted by Collingwood, North Melbourne or Carlton. Winmar played a total of 21 games for the club, kicking 34 goals, before retiring from the Western Bulldogs at the end of the 1999 season, halfway through a two-year contract, citing issues with a commitment to training and injuries. Winmar was named National Aboriginal Sportsman of the Year at the National Aboriginal and Torres Strait Islander Sports Awards held in Hobart, Tasmania, sharing the award with rugby league player Cliff Lyons.

Later life
Following his retirement from the AFL, Winmar played with various clubs in regional and country leagues in Victoria and the Northern Territory, including for the Palmerston Football Club in the Northern Territory Football League, for the Warburton and Seville Football Clubs in the Yarra Valley Mountain District Football League and for Rutherglen and the Wodonga clubs in the Tallangatta & District Football League. Having previously worked with Denfam (a Melbourne-based construction business) and as a shearer, Winmar was employed with the mining industry and living in Brookton, Western Australia, as of May 2012. On a visit to Perth in September 2012, Winmar had a heart attack and was hospitalised at Royal Perth Hospital.

Winmar was named in St Kilda's Team of the Century (announced in 2003) on a half-forward flank and has also been inducted into the club's hall of fame. Winmar was subsequently named in the AFL's Indigenous Team of the Century, announced in 2005, as well as South Fremantle's Indigenous Team of the Century, named in 2009, and was also inducted into the West Australian Football Hall of Fame in the same year. A tournament for underage indigenous footballers, the Nicky Winmar Cup, has been contested since 2009 as a joint venture between the West Australian Football Commission and the Western Australian Department of Sport and Recreation, sponsored by Alinta, an energy company. Two of Winmar's cousins, Leroy Jetta and Nicholas Winmar, were formerly listed with AFL clubs ( and St Kilda, respectively).

Winmar was convicted and fined in 2000 for assaulting his ex-wife on Christmas Day of the previous year. In 2019, Winmar pleaded guilty to a charge of assaulting a taxi driver in March of that year. On  June 14, 2022 Nicky was inducted into AFL Hall of Fame.

Racial vilification
Winmar was involved in a number of controversial incidents involving alleged acts of racial vilification against him by other players and staff during his career. In 1998, after Winmar's reaction to Carlton, former Hawthorn player Dermott Brereton publicly apologised to Winmar and Russell Jeffrey for abusing them in a game in 1990. In March 1999, television presenter and former footballer Sam Newman appeared on The Footy Show in blackface after Winmar cancelled an appearance on the show in favour of appearing on a rival network. Newman was later forced to apologise for the incident, subsequently breaking a confidentiality agreement that had been signed during mediation for the incident. Winmar appeared on The Footy Show the following week as part of a pre-taped segment.

Famous photograph

In a match for St Kilda against Collingwood in Round 4 of the 1993 season, Winmar was racially abused by members of the Collingwood cheer squad, who yelled for him to "go and sniff some petrol" and "go walkabout where you came from". At the conclusion of the game, which St Kilda won by 22 points, Winmar lifted up his jumper and, facing to the crowd, pointed to his skin. The following day, a photograph (pictured right) of Winmar's gesture, taken by Wayne Ludbey, was published in the Sunday Age under the headline "Winmar: I'm black and proud of it", with the Sunday Herald Sun publishing a similar photograph under the caption "I've got guts". Winmar's gesture, described as a "powerful statement", an "anti-racist symbol", and one of the "most poignant" images in Australian sport, has been credited as a catalyst for the movement against racism in Australian football, and compared to the black power salute performed by American athletes at the 1968 Summer Olympics in terms of impact.

The event inspired Indigenous singer-songwriter Archie Roach to write the song "Colour of Your Jumper". The photograph is reproduced in The Game That Made Australia, a mural painted by Jamie Cooper and commissioned by the AFL in 2008 to celebrate the 150th anniversary of the origins of Australian rules football. Tony Albert included a watercolour of the photograph in a collage titled Once upon a time, winner of the 2014 Basil Sellers Art Prize. In 2019, a bronze statue based on the photograph was unveiled outside Perth Stadium.

Winmar donated the jumper he was wearing in the photograph to the Aboriginal and Torres Strait Islander Commission (ATSIC) in 1998. Prior to the commission's disbanding in 2005, Geoff Clark, the chairman of ATSIC at the time, removed the framed jumper from the commission's offices in Canberra to his home in Warrnambool, Victoria. Clark was forced to return the jumper to Winmar, which was later donated to the National Museum of Australia, where it featured in Off the Walls, an exhibit of Indigenous Australian art. In May 2012, the jumper was auctioned by Sotheby's, but was passed in after the bidding reached A$95,000. In September of the same year, Museum Victoria purchased the jumper for $100,000, with the intention to display it at the First Peoples exhibition at Melbourne Museum in July 2013. However, the authenticity of the jumper has been questioned, with the St Kilda Football Club published a statement in March 2005 suggesting that the jumper given to ATSIC may not have been the actual jumper worn during the game, citing differences between sponsors' logos present on the jumper. Similar questions were raised prior to the jumper's auction in 2012.

Playing statistics

|-
|- style="background-color: #EAEAEA"
! scope="row" style="text-align:center" | 1987
|style="text-align:center;"|
| 7 || 20 || 37 || 28 || 290 || 82 || 372 || 90 || 39 || 1.9 || 1.4 || 14.5 || 4.1 || 18.6 || 4.5 || 2.0
|-
! scope="row" style="text-align:center" | 1988
|style="text-align:center;"|
| 7 || 21 || 43 || 39 || 299 || 60 || 359 || 89 || 29 || 2.0 || 1.9 || 14.2 || 2.9 || 17.1 || 4.2 || 1.4
|- style="background-color: #EAEAEA"
! scope="row" style="text-align:center" | 1989
|style="text-align:center;"|
| 7 || 22 || 43 || 36 || 329 || 81 || 410 || 102 || 30 || 2.0 || 1.6 || 15.0 || 3.7 || 18.6 || 4.6 || 1.4
|-
! scope="row" style="text-align:center" | 1990
|style="text-align:center;"|
| 7 || 17 || 26 || 33 || 210 || 97 || 307 || 55 || 26 || 1.5 || 1.9 || 12.4 || 5.7 || 18.1 || 3.2 || 1.5
|- style="background-color: #EAEAEA"
! scope="row" style="text-align:center" | 1991
|style="text-align:center;"|
| 7 || 17 || 12 || 13 || 295 || 135 || 430 || 65 || 38 || 0.7 || 0.8 || 17.4 || 7.9 || 25.3 || 3.8 || 2.2
|-
! scope="row" style="text-align:center" | 1992
|style="text-align:center;"|
| 7 || 23 || 21 || 14 || 388 || 137 || 525 || 102 || 55 || 0.9 || 0.6 || 16.9 || 6.0 || 22.8 || 4.4 || 2.4
|- style="background-color: #EAEAEA"
! scope="row" style="text-align:center" | 1993
|style="text-align:center;"|
| 7 || 16 || 12 || 10 || 273 || 102 || 375 || 64 || 37 || 0.8 || 0.6 || 17.1 || 6.4 || 23.4 || 4.0 || 2.3
|-
! scope="row" style="text-align:center" | 1994
|style="text-align:center;"|
| 7 || 17 || 15 || 12 || 257 || 100 || 357 || 67 || 33 || 0.9 || 0.7 || 15.1 || 5.9 || 21.0 || 3.9 || 1.9
|- style="background-color: #EAEAEA"
! scope="row" style="text-align:center" | 1995
|style="text-align:center;"|
| 7 || 22 || 21 || 21 || 386 || 161 || 547 || 97 || 66 || 1.0 || 1.0 || 17.5 || 7.3 || 24.9 || 4.4 || 3.0
|-
! scope="row" style="text-align:center" | 1996
|style="text-align:center;"|
| 7 || 11 || 10 || 5 || 149 || 75 || 224 || 50 || 16 || 0.9 || 0.5 || 13.5 || 6.8 || 20.4 || 4.5 || 1.5
|- style="background-color: #EAEAEA"
! scope="row" style="text-align:center" | 1997
|style="text-align:center;"|
| 7 || 21 || 27 || 18 || 254 || 111 || 365 || 68 || 36 || 1.3 || 0.9 || 12.1 || 5.3 || 17.4 || 3.2 || 1.7
|-
! scope="row" style="text-align:center" | 1998
|style="text-align:center;"|
| 7 || 23 || 16 || 19 || 307 || 187 || 494 || 109 || 54 || 0.7 || 0.8 || 13.3 || 8.1 || 21.5 || 4.7 || 2.3
|- style="background-color: #EAEAEA"
! scope="row" style="text-align:center" | 1999
|style="text-align:center;"|
| 1 || 21 || 34 || 14 || 158 || 73 || 231 || 69 || 13 || 1.6 || 0.7 || 7.5 || 3.5 || 11.0 || 3.3 || 0.6
|- class="sortbottom"
! colspan=3| Career
! 251
! 317
! 262
! 3595
! 1401
! 4996
! 1027
! 472
! 1.3
! 1.0
! 14.3
! 5.6
! 19.9
! 4.1
! 1.9
|}

Honours and achievements

Team
McClelland Trophy (St Kilda): 1997
Pre-Season Cup (St Kilda): 1996
Individual
All-Australian: 1991, 1995
Herald Sun Player of the Year Award: 1995
Trevor Barker Award (St Kilda F.C. Best & Fairest): 1989, 1995
St Kilda F.C. Leading Goalkicker: 1988
Alex Jesaulenko Medal (Mark of the Year Award): 1992
Michael Tuck Medal: 1996
Aboriginal Sportsperson of the Year: 1999
St Kilda F.C. Team of the Century – Right Wing
St Kilda F.C. Hall of Fame Inductee: 2003
West Australian Football Hall of Fame Inductee: 2009
Indigenous Team of the Century – Half-Forward Flank

References

Further reading

External links

1965 births
All-Australians (AFL)
Australian rules footballers from Western Australia
Indigenous Australian players of Australian rules football
Living people
Noongar people
Palmerston Football Club players
People from Kellerberrin, Western Australia
South Fremantle Football Club players
St Kilda Football Club players
Trevor Barker Award winners
West Australian Football Hall of Fame inductees
Western Australian State of Origin players
Western Bulldogs players